FC Rouen Féminin is the women's team of French football club FC Rouen, based in Rouen.

History
The team was originally established in 1970. In 1974 it was one of the twelve founding clubs of the Division 1 Féminine, and in 1976 it was the championship's runner-up. However, the section was dissolved the following year. In 2001 FC Rouen again created a women's team, which currently competes in the second tier. Most recently it was 8th in the category's Group A and it reached the 2012 Coupe de France's Round of 64.

Titles
 Coupe de Normandie
 2010, 2011, 2012

References

FC Rouen
Rouen
Association football clubs established in 1970
Sport in Rouen
Division 1 Féminine clubs
Football clubs in Normandy
1970 establishments in France